Eupithecia pseudoabbreviata is a moth in the family Geometridae. It was described by David Stephen Fletcher in 1951. It is found in Ethiopia.

References

Endemic fauna of Ethiopia
Moths described in 1951
pseudoabbreviata
Insects of Ethiopia
Moths of Africa